Matheus Ferreira de Moraes Gonche (born 5 January 1999) is a Brazilian swimmer. 

He competed in the 2020 Summer Olympics, where he finished 43rd in the Men's 100 metre butterfly.

He was at the 2022 World Aquatics Championships held in Budapest, Hungary, where he finished 10th in the Men's 4 × 100 metre medley relay, along with João Gomes Júnior, Guilherme Basseto and Luiz Gustavo Borges. , 18th in the Men's 100 metre butterfly and 33rd in the Men's 200 metre butterfly.

References

1999 births
Living people
Swimmers at the 2020 Summer Olympics
Brazilian male butterfly swimmers
Olympic swimmers of Brazil
People from Resende
South American Games medalists in swimming
Competitors at the 2018 South American Games
Sportspeople from Rio de Janeiro (state)
21st-century Brazilian people
South American Games gold medalists for Brazil
South American Games silver medalists for Brazil
South American Games bronze medalists for Brazil